Boldklubben Femina (also known as BK Femina or Femina) is a women's association football team that play in Gladsaxe, Denmark. The club was formed in 1959 and play in white. In 2009 the club celebrated its 50th anniversary. At the time, the team was playing regional seven–a–side football under the auspices of the Sjællands Boldspil Union (SBU).

History
In Autumn 1959 Alf Mørkeberg, a journalist from Femina women's magazine, was sent to cover an exhibition match played by student nurses in Slagelse. Impressed by the level of play, Mørkeberg decided to form a permanent team and recruited several of the nurses, who had usually played handball. A meeting was held at the magazine's offices in Valby on 13 October 1959 to draw up the articles of association.

The new club's name, kit, boots and travelling expenses were supplied by Femina. Mørkeberg penned a weekly column in the magazine and enlisted the help of experienced male coaches to train the team. Although the magazine withdrew all financial support and coverage in 1962, the team continued to attract sponsors and media attention. In 1968 the club toured Czechoslovakia and acquired two leading Czech players who defected from the communist regime.

In 1969 a privately funded governing body, Fédération Internationale Européenne de Football Féminine (FIEFF), invited BK Femina to a four–team Coppa Europa per Nazioni (European Cup) competition in northern Italy that November. Despite the presence of the Czech players BK Femina were to represent Denmark. With accommodation and rail travel provided by sponsors Martini & Rossi, BK Femina met an unofficial England XI at Aosta Valley in the north–west corner of Italy. Although captain Sue Lopez scored a hat-trick, the English were defeated 4–3. The following day at the Stadio Comunale in Turin, a 10,000 crowd saw England beat France 2–0 in the third place play–off, then BK Femina lose 3–1 to the host country in the final.

In summer 1970 FIEFF invited the club to represent Denmark again, this time in a Coppa del Mondo (World Cup) tournament. The team had to wear AC Milan shirts when their usual white ones were lost in transit. After reaching the final at the Stadio Comunale again, they took revenge on Italy and won 2–0 before 40,000 spectators. FIEFF's next tournament was the 1971 Mundial, held in Mexico, which was won by a Denmark team selected from the whole country.

The Faxe Brewery had sponsored BK Femina with DKK4,000 during the second part of 1970 and DKK10,000 in 1971. In 1972, under instruction from UEFA, the Dansk Boldspil-Union (DBU) took control of women's football in Denmark. As all Danish domestic football remained strictly amateur, the sponsorship deals which had driven BK Femina's success were prohibited.

Honours
 Danish champions (3): 1975, 1977, 1980
 World champions (1): 1970

References

Bibliography

 
 

Women's football clubs in Denmark
Association football clubs established in 1959
1959 establishments in Denmark
Gladsaxe Municipality